The following is a complete list of all volumes of The Amazing Spider-Man, with notes for each issue. The list is updated as of March 10, 2023.

Amazing Fantasy #15 (August 1962)
This comic book plot is written by Stan Lee and illustrated by Steve Ditko. Features the first appearances of Spider-Man, Aunt May, Uncle Ben, Flash Thompson, and Liz Allan. High school student Peter Parker is bitten by a radioactive spider, thus gaining the proportionate strength, speed, and agility of a spider, along with a precognitive "spider-sense" and later creating a web-shooting device. Peter becomes Spider-Man, an instant TV sensation, but coming out of a TV studio one day, Peter does not stop an escaping burglar, claiming it is not his problem. A few days later, he comes home to find his Uncle Ben has been shot and goes to track down the murderer, only to find that it was the same burglar that he had let escape a few days earlier. Peter blames himself for his uncle's death and realizes that with great power there must also come great responsibility.

This issue was released on June 5, 1962, and was published in August 1962.

The Amazing Spider-Man #1–100 (March 1963 – September 1971)

The Amazing Spider-Man #101–200 (October 1971 – January 1980)

The Amazing Spider-Man #201–300 (February 1980 – May 1988)

The Amazing Spider-Man #301–400 (June 1988 – April 1995)

The Amazing Spider-Man #401–499 (May 1995 - November 2003)

The Amazing Spider-Man #401–441 (May 1995 – November 1998)

The Amazing Spider-Man (vol. 2) #1–58 (January 1999 – November 2003)

The Amazing Spider-Man #500–545 (December 2003 – January 2008)

The Amazing Spider-Man #546–647 "Brand New Day" (January 2008 – November 2010)

Note: Brand New Day is a soft reboot stemming out of the events of One More Day. Three issues of The Amazing Spider-Man were published each month during this time. See Free Comic Book Day (2007): Spider-Man.

The Amazing Spider-Man #648–700 (November 2010 – December 2012)
Note: During the "Big Time" storyline, two issues of The Amazing Spider-Man were published each month at the increased length of 30 pages each (compared to the traditional 22 pages).

The Amazing Spider-Man #701–801 (January 2013 – June 2018)

Superior Spider-Man (vol. 1) #1–33 (January 2013 – April 2014)

The Amazing Spider-Man (vol. 3) #1–20 (April 2014 – August 2015) — Marvel NOW!

Amazing Spider-Man: Renew Your Vows (vol. 1) #1–5 (June 2015 – September 2015)
Note: Amazing Spider-Man: Renew Your Vows is a Secret Wars tie-in miniseries set in an alternate universe where One More Day never happened. The miniseries is counted as part of the legacy numbering for The Amazing Spider-Man.

The Amazing Spider-Man (vol. 4) #1–32 (October 2015 – September 2017) — All-New, All-Different Marvel

The Amazing Spider-Man #789–801 (October 2017 – June 2018) — Marvel Legacy

The Amazing Spider-Man #802–894 (July 2018 – March 2022)

The Amazing Spider-Man (vol. 5) #1–74 (July 2018 – September 2021) — Fresh Start

Note: See Free Comic Book Day (2018): Amazing Spider-Man.

The Amazing Spider-Man (vol. 5) #75–93 (October 2021 – March 2022) — Spider-Man: Beyond
Note: See Free Comic Book Day (2021): Spider-Man/Venom.

The Amazing Spider-Man #895–current (April 2022 – present)

The Amazing Spider-Man (vol. 6) #1–current (April 2022 – present)

The Amazing Spider-Man Annual

The Amazing Spider-Man trade paperbacks
Note: * = Not released yet

Marvel Masterworks: The Amazing Spider-Man

The Amazing Spider-Man Epic Collections

The Amazing Spider-Man Omnibuses

Upcoming issues of The Amazing Spider-Man
Note: These are the official solicitations released by the company. They are always subject to change, as these issues have not been released yet.

Other issues
The Amazing Spider-Man Super Special #-1 (June 1995) – Story 1: "The Far Cry!" – Story 2: "Street Fear" – Story 3: "Ghosts",– (David Michelinie/Dave Hoover) Part of the Planet of the Symbiotes storyline.
The Amazing Spider-Man #-1: "Flashback" – (July 1997) – (Tom DeFalco/Joe Bennett)
The Amazing Spider-Man – Free Comic Book Day #1 (June 2007; released May 5, 2007; officially titled as Free Comic Book Day 2007: Spider-Man #1 in the comic's legal indicia) – "Swing Shift" – Dan Slott/Phil Jimenez – First appearance of Overdrive, Mister Negative, Jackpot, Vin Gonzales. First (unofficial) appearance of the "Brand New Day" storyline (this story was later reprinted with new material as The Amazing Spider-Man: Swing Shift (Director's Cut) in 2008).
The Amazing Spider-Man: Extra! #1 (one-shot issue; September 2008; released July 30, 2008) – Story 1: "Death of a Wise Guy" (Joe Kelly/Chris Bachalo) – Hammerhead is operated on by Mister Negative (backstory for The Amazing Spider-Man #575). – Story 2: "Birthday Boy" (Zeb Wells/Patrick Olliffe) – Spider-Man battles the Trapster and attends Harry's birthday party. – Story 3: "The Spartacus Gambit. Character Assassination: Interlude" (Marc Guggenheim/Marcos Martin) – Spider-Man is in police custody and, with Matt Murdock as his lawyer, is dealing with criminal charges on multiple counts of assault, murder, and obstruction of justice and with a civil suit (part of the "Character Assassination" storyline starting in The Amazing Spider-Man #582).
The Amazing Spider-Man: Extra! #2 (one-shot issue; March 2009; released January 28, 2009) – Story 1: "Anti-Venom Returns" (Dan Slott/Chris Bachalo) – Story 2: "A Night with Wolverine" (Zeb Wells/Paolo Rivera)
The Amazing Spider-Man: Extra! #3 (one-shot issue; May 2009; released March 18, 2009)
Free Comic Book Day Vol. 2018 Amazing Spider-Man (May 2018) – (Nick Spencer/Ryan Ottley) "Amazing Spider-Man" leads into the events of the 2018 series.
Free Comic Book Day Vol. 2021 Spider-Man/Venom (August 2021) – (Zeb Wells/Patrick Gleason) Leads into Spider-Man: Beyond.

See also
List of Spider-Man titles

References

External links
The Amazing Spider-Man at SpiderFan.org
Amazing Spider-Man resource information

Lists of Spider-Man comics
Amazing Spider-Man
Amazing Spider-Man